Elly Petersen is a 1944 Danish drama film directed by Jon Iversen and Alice O'Fredericks.

Cast
Bodil Kjer as Elly Petersen
Poul Reichhardt as Hjalmer
Lilian Ellis as Nina
Karl Gustav Ahlefeldt as Leif Faber
Grethe Holmer as Lise Faber
Betty Helsengreen as Agnes
Irwin Hasselmann as Lauritsen
Ib Schønberg as Hjalmars far
Valdemar Skjerning

External links

1944 films
1940s Danish-language films
1944 drama films
Danish black-and-white films
Films directed by Alice O'Fredericks
Films scored by Sven Gyldmark
Danish drama films